Ashish Yadav (born 1 September 1985) is an Indian cricketer. He made his first-class debut for Uttar Pradesh in the 2010–11 Ranji Trophy on 1 December 2010. He was the leading wicket-taker for Railways in the 2018–19 Vijay Hazare Trophy, with eleven dismissals in six matches.

References

External links
 

1985 births
Living people
Indian cricketers
Place of birth missing (living people)
Railways cricketers
Uttar Pradesh cricketers